The NewNowNext-Awards is an American annual entertainment awards show, presented by the lesbian, gay, bisexual and transgender-themed channel Logo TV. Launched in 2008, awards are presented both for LGBT-specific and general interest achievements in entertainment and pop culture.

2008 

The nominees were announced by Cazwell and Amanda Lepore. Hosts were Candis Cayne and Colman Domingo. Music acts were The Cliks, Dangerous Muse, Cyndi Lauper, and Lady Gaga (making her TV debut).

Production Co: Pro - Active Entertainment Group

Winners 
 Best.Lesbian.Vlog.Ever: Brunch With Bridget
 Best Gay Kiss: Jack (John Barrowman) and Ianto (Gareth David-Lloyd) on Torchwood
 Brink of Fame Song: "Semi Precious Weapons" by Semi Precious Weapons
 Most Addictive Reality Star Award:  Christian Siriano
 The Kylie Award (Next International Crossover):  Leona Lewis
 Brink of Fame Actress: Candis Cayne
 Most Guiltiest Pleasure Award: A Shot at Love with Tila Tequila
 Best Show You're Not Watching: The Sarah Silverman Program
 'Cause You're Hot: Tina Fey
 Brink of Fame Comic: Julie Goldman
 Totally Most Rad Sickest Blog Ever: Dlisted.com
 OMFG Internet Award: Planet Unicorn
 Always Next, Forever Now Award: Janet Jackson
 Because You Deserve An Award: Gossip Girl
 Brink of Fame Music Artist: The Cliks
 Best Future Feature: Another Gay Sequel: Gays Gone Wild!
 BreakOut Destination: Bahia, Brazil
 Brink of Fame: Author: T. Cooper
 Brink of Fame Filmmaker: Jamie Babbit
 Hottest Downe & Out character on TV: Rose Rollins (Tasha, The L Word)
 Best Upcoming Industry Gay Gaming Professional: Jeb Havens
 Best Collegiate Coach: Kirk Walters

2009 

The 2009 awards show was hosted by RuPaul on May 21 at the Hiro Ballroom at the Maritime Hotel in NYC. The show aired on LOGO on June 13. The "Always Next, Forever Now Award" was presented to Britney Spears. Performers included Morningwood, Storm Lee, The Fire and Reason, and The Paradiso Girls.

Winners 
 Brink of Fame Actor:  Nelsan Ellis
 OMFG Internet Award: Prop 8 - The Musical
 Best Show You’re Not Watching: True Blood
 Most Guiltiest Pleasure: The Wendy Williams Show
 Most Addictive Reality Star: Ongina, RuPaul's Drag Race
 'Cause You’re Hot: Jessica Clark
 Best Future Feature: Brüno
 Brink of Fame Music Artist: The Fire and Reason
 Brink of Fame Comic: Kate McKinnon
 Always Next, Forever Now Award: Britney Spears

2010 
The 2010 NewNowNext Awards were held in Los Angeles and premiered on June 17, 2010 on Logo. Niecy Nash and Cheyenne Jackson co-hosted the awards show.

Winners 
 Brink of Fame Actor: Lea Michele
 OMFG Internet Award: Lesbians Who Look Like Justin Bieber
 Best Show You’re Not Watching: Archer
 Best New Indulgence: The splits on RuPaul's Drag Race
 Most Addictive Reality Star: Johnny Weir, Be Good Johnny Weir
 'Cause You’re Hot: Jesus Luz
 Best Future Feature: Burlesque
 Brink of Fame Music Artist: Agnes
 Brink of Fame Comic: Michelle Collins
 Always Next, Forever Now Award: Paula Abdul

2011
The 2011 NewNowNext Awards were presented on April 7, 2011 and were hosted by James Van Der Beek. The awards telecast premiered on Logo on April 11.

Nominees and winners
Winners designated in bold

Brink of Fame Actor: 
 Andrew Garfield
 Darren Criss
 Donald Glover
 Emma Stone
 Nicholas Hoult
 Rooney Mara

#zOMG Internet Award
 @CarrieFFisher on Twitter (tie)
 DamnYouAutoCorrect.com
 JamesVanDerMemes.com (tie)
 Mike Tompkins
 Sassy Gay Friend

TV You Betta Watch
 1 Girl 5 Gays
 Pretty Little Liars
 Skins
 The Game
 The Walking Dead
 Vampire Diaries

Best New Indulgence
 Angry Birds
 Netflix Watch Instantly
 OWN
 New Kids On The Block/Backstreet Boys – Summer Tour 2011
 TJ Kelly, The A-List: New York

Most Addictive Reality Star
 Tabatha Coffey, Tabatha's Salon Takeover
 Tyler & Catelynn, Teen Mom
 Carmen Carrera, RuPaul's Drag Race
 Josh Kilmer-Purcell & Brent Ridge, The Fabulous Beekman Boys

'Cause You're Hot
 Amber Heard
 Archie Panjabi
 Ben Cohen
 Jesse Williams
 Joe Manganiello
 Sofia Vergara

Next Must-See Movie
 Bridesmaids
 Harry Potter and the Deathly Hallows – Part 2
 The Smurfs
 Water for Elephants
 X-Men: First Class

Brink of Fame Music Artist
 Oh Land
 Sleigh Bells
 Two Door Cinema Club
 Willow Smith
 Wynter Gordon

Always Next, Forever Now Award: Lady Gaga

2012

Nominees

Next Mega Star
 Lizzy Caplan (New Girl, FOX)
 Josh Hutcherson (The Hunger Games)
 Michael B. Jordan (Parenthood, NBC)
 Elizabeth Olsen (Kill Your Darlings)
 Emily VanCamp (Revenge, ABC)

Brink-of-Fame: Music Artist
 Azealia Banks (Interscope Records)
 Childish Gambino (Glassnote Records)
 FUN. (Atlantic Records)
 Jessie J. (Universal Republic Records)
 Neon Hitch (Warner Bros. Records)
 Rebecca Ferguson (Columbia Records)

Most Addictive Reality Star
 Abby Lee Miller (Dance Moms, Lifetime)
 Andy Cohen (Watch What Happens Live, Bravo)
 Big Ang (Mob Wives, VH1)
 Evelyn (Basketball Wives, VH1)
 Nadia G. (Bitchin' Kitchen, Cooking Channel)
 Willam Belli (RuPaul's Drag Race, Logo)

Cause You're Hot 
 Channing Tatum (Magic Mike)
 Henry Cavill (The Tudors, Showtime)
 Jessica Lange (American Horror Story, FX)
 Naya Rivera (Glee, Fox)
 Novak Djokovic (tennis player)
 Paula Patton (MI4, Paramount)

Beyond Style Award
 Andrej Pejic (model)
 China Chow (Work of Art: The Next Great Artist, Bravo)
 Jeremy Scott (designer)
 Kelly Osbourne
 Sean Avery (writer)

Best New Indulgence
 Absolutely Fabulous Revival (BBC/Logo)
 Pinterest.com
 Seamless.com
 Revenge (ABC)

Next Must-See Movie
 Magic Mike (WB)
 Moonrise Kingdom (Univ)
 Prometheus (Fox)
 Snow White & the Huntsman (Univ)
 Ted (Univ)
 The Avengers (Par)

TV You Betta Watch
 Game of Thrones (HBO)
 GCB (ABC)
 Homeland (Showtime)
 Portlandia (IFC)
 Savage U (MTV)
 Shameless (Showtime)

Superfan Site Award
http://adam-lambert.org
http://ladygaganow.net
http://lipsyncforyourlife.tumblr.com
http://realitytvgifs.tumblr.com
http://trueblood-news.com
 http://vampire-diaries.net

2013

Nominees

Next Mega-Star

Allison Williams (Girls, HBO)
Andrew Rannells (The New Normal, NBC)
Dave Franco (Warm Bodies, Summit Ent.)
Julianne Hough (Safe Haven, Relativity)
Kerry Washington (Scandal, ABC)
Rebel Wilson (Pitch Perfect, Universal)

Next Must-See Movie

Fruitvale, Weinstein Company
Man of Steel, Warner Bros.
Pacific Rim, Warner Bros.
Star Trek Into Darkness, Paramount
The Great Gatsby, Warner Bros.
The Heat, Fox

TV You Betta Watch

Catfish: The TV Show, MTV
House of Cards, Netflix
Scandal, ABCThe Americans, FX
Veep, HBO
Workaholics, Comedy CentralMost Addictive Reality StarAbby Lee Miller, Dance Moms, Lifetime
Kris Jenner, Keeping Up with the Kardashians, E!
Naomi Campbell, The Face, OxygenReza Farahan, Shahs of Sunset, BravoTamar Braxton, Tamar & Vince, WE tvBest New IndulgenceArrow, CW
Betty F$!king White on TwitterGeorge Takei on FacebookReal Husbands of Hollywood, BET
Vine App on TwitterBeyond StyleAdele in Christopher Bailey for Burberry (MTV Music Awards)
Elle Fanning in Rodarte (Rodarte Campaign)Jennifer Lawrence in Dior (Oscars)Kelly Rowland in Georges Chakra (Grammy’s)
Kendall Jenner in Sherry Hill (Sherry Hill Fashion Show)
Michelle Obama in Jason Wu (State of the Union)Cause You’re HotAdan Canto, The Following, FoxBarry Sloane, Revenge, ABCHenry Cavill, Man of Steel, Warner Bros.
Mahershala Ali, House of Cards, Netflix
Richard Madden, Game of Thrones, HBO
Stephen Amell, Arrow, CWSuperfan Sitef$!kyeahdragrace.tumblr.comgrumpycats.comhungergamestrilogy.net
rihannadaily.com
westeros.orgThat's My JamBruno Mars, "When I Was Your Man", Atlantic RecordsKesha, "C'Mon", Kemosabe Records/RCA RecordsMacklemore & Ryan Lewis, "Can't Hold Us", Macklemore
P!nk feat. Nate Ruess, "Just Give Me a Reason", RCA Records
Solange Knowles, "Losing You", Terrible Records
Tegan and Sara, "Closer", Vapor/Sire RecordsCoolest Cameo2 Chainz, 2 Broke Girls, CBS
Adam Levine, American Horror Story, FX
Joan Collins, Happily Divorced, TV Land
Joe Biden, Parks and Recreation, NBCJohnny Depp, 21 Jump Street, Sony Picts.Ryan Reynolds, Ted, Universal Picts.Host with the MostChris Hardwick, Talking Dead, AMC, “The Nerdist,” BBCAChelsea Handler, Chelsea Lately'', E!
Heidi Hamilton, That Sex Show, Logo
Michelle Buteau, Best Week Ever, VH1
Padma Lakshmi, Top Chef, Bravo
Stephen Colbert, The Colbert Report'', Comedy Central

Foreign Import of the Year

Benedict Cumberbatch
Maggie Smith
Nicholas Hoult
 One Direction

Hottest, Sexiest Ink

Adam Levine
Adele
Colin Kaepernick
David Beckham
Rihanna
Zoe Saldana

Best New Do

Anne Hathaway
Charlize Theron
Justin Bieber
Miley Cyrus
Nicki Minaj
Robin Wright
 
Most Innovative Charity of the Year

Astraea Lesbian Foundation for Justice
Born This Way Foundation
 Housing Works
 It Gets Better Project
OutServe-SLDN
The Point Foundation

References

External links 
 Official site
 http://www.turkcealtyazi.org/mov/1249305/newnownext-awards-pre-show.html
 https://www.imdb.com/title/tt1249305/
 https://web.archive.org/web/20160303214609/http://www.elfilm.com/listing/company/7927

LGBT-related mass media in the United States
LGBT-related awards
American television awards
LGBT portrayals in mass media
Logo TV original programming